is a municipality in Rogaland county, Norway. It is located in the traditional district of Ryfylke. The administrative centre of the municipality is the village of Hjelmelandsvågen. Other villages in the municipality include Fister, Årdal, and Jøsenfjorden.

Hjelmeland is known for its fruit (apples, pears, plums, cherries and strawberries) and fish production. Salmon has been important for the fish industry in Hjelmeland for a couple of decades, but white fish such as cod and halibut has increased its value in the latter years.

The  municipality is the 105th largest by area out of the 356 municipalities in Norway. Hjelmeland is the 250th most populous municipality in Norway with a population of 2,534.

General information

Hjelmeland was established as a municipality on 1 January 1838 (see formannskapsdistrikt law). In 1859, Hjelmeland municipality was split into two: the southern portion of the municipality (population: 1,315) was split off to form the new municipality of Årdal and the remainder of the municipality became the municipality of Hjelmeland og Fister (population: 3,084). On 1 July 1884, the western islands and the western coast of the mainland (population: 832) were split off from Hjelmeland og Fister to form the new municipality of Fister and the rest of the municipality was renamed simply "Hjelmeland" which now had 2,249 residents.

During the 1960s, there were many municipal mergers across Norway due to the work of the Schei Committee. On 1 January 1965, all of Hjelemland municipality (population: 1,691) was merged with most of the municipality of Årdal (except the Sundgardene area along the Årdalsfjorden), the mainland part and the island of Randøy from the municipality of Fister, and the small Buergårdene area on Ombo from the municipality of Jelsa. The population of the newly enlarged Hjelemland was 2,909; nearly doubling the size of the municipal population.

On 1 January 2020, the parts of Hjelmeland municipality that were located on the island of Ombo were transferred to the neighboring Stavanger Municipality so that the whole island would be part of the same municipality.

Name
The municipality (originally the parish) is named after the old Hjelmeland farm, since the first Hjelmeland Church was built there. Today the farm is a part of the Hjelmelandsvågen urban area. The first element of the name is the plural genitive case of hjalmr which means "helmet" and this is referring to two heights behind the farm which have the form of two helmets. The last element is land which means "land" or "farm".

Coat of arms
The coat of arms was granted on 30 November 1984. The arms show a six yellow woven straws on a red background. They are based on the local tradition of making chairs and other furniture with seats of woven twigs. The process of weaving is symbolised in the arms. At the same time the arms show the strength and solidarity of the municipality.

Churches
The Church of Norway has three parishes within the municipality of Hjelmeland. It is part of the Ryfylke prosti (deanery) in the Diocese of Stavanger.

Government
All municipalities in Norway, including Hjelmeland, are responsible for primary education (through 10th grade), outpatient health services, senior citizen services, unemployment and other social services, zoning, economic development, and municipal roads. The municipality is governed by a municipal council of elected representatives, which in turn elect a mayor.  The municipality falls under the Sør-Rogaland District Court and the Gulating Court of Appeal.

Municipal council
The municipal council of Hjelmeland is made up of 19 representatives that are elected to four year terms. Currently, the party breakdown is as follows:

Geography

The municipality stretches from the mountains bordering the Setesdal valley to the shores of the fjords that connect to the main Boknafjorden. The small Jøsenfjorden and Årdalsfjorden cut into the mainland. There are several islands that are part of Hjelmeland including Randøy as well as some smaller surrounding islands. The island of Randøy is connected to the mainland by the Randøy Bridge.

There are several large lakes in the municipality including Nilsebuvatnet, Øvre Tysdalsvatnet, and Tysdalsvatnet. The large lake Blåsjø partially lies in the municipality. The Trollgarden glacial moraine lies atop a mountain in Hjelmeland. The Ritland crater is also located in the municipality.

Notable people 
 Jacob Tostrup (1806 in Hjelmeland – 1890) a Norwegian jeweller, goldsmith and silversmith
 Per Hovda (1908 in Hjelmeland – 1997) a Norwegian philologist
 Per Pedersen Tjøstland (1918 in Fister - 2004) a Norwegian Nazi activist and SS volunteer
 Kjell Erfjord (born 1940 in Hjelmeland) a Norwegian former educator and politician, Mayor of Lund 1981-1991 and 1999-2007

References

External links

 
 
 Municipal fact sheet from Statistics Norway 
 Ryfylke tourist bureau

 
Municipalities of Rogaland
1838 establishments in Norway